Lorna Katie Fitzgerald (born 17 April 1996) is a British actress from Northampton. Her most notable role to date is that of Abi Branning in the BBC soap opera, EastEnders. Since leaving EastEnders in January 2018, Fitzgerald has developed her acting career on the stage and in movies.

Personal life 
Fitzgerald started attending Stagecoach Drama Classes at the age of four. She has two older sisters and is a keen dancer. Fitzgerald also plays the guitar.

In November 2009, Fitzgerald was involved in a charity project in Northampton called Talking With Hands, a charity for people with hearing impairments and deafness. The project featured on ITV's Anglia News, alongside deaf actor Alex Nowak, and Fitzgerald helped with this project.

Career 
Fitzgerald has appeared in the Casualty episode "Animals", and a short film called Big Girl, Little Girl. She also appeared in the ITV drama The Golden Hour, as well as playing Sarah Lancashire's daughter Jade Cannings in Cherished, and Young Bex in According to Bex. She has appeared in adverts for Childline and Nescafe.

After attending acting classes, Fitzgerald joined the Stagecoach Theatre Arts School in Stony Stratford, and Derngate Theatre School. Her agent put her forward for a role in BBC One soap opera EastEnders, and after attending three auditions she was cast as Abi Branning. She made her first appearance as Abi in July 2006. On 10 September 2017, it was announced that Fitzgerald would be leaving the role after almost 12 years, with her exit airing on 19 January 2018.

Fitzgerald made her professional stage debut in February 2018, starring as Jackie Dimmock in the world premiere of Howard Brenton's The Shadow Factory in Nuffield Theatre, Southampton. She won acclaim for her debut performance and was shortlisted in the nominations for 'Best actress in a Play' at The Stage Debut Awards.   In October 2018, Fitzgerald played the role of Eve Douglas in the regional premiere of Her Naked Skin by Rebecca Lenkiewicz at Salisbury Playhouse

Sustaining an early 20th century theme, in 2019 Fitzgerald starred as Iris Henderson in a stage version of Alfred Hitchcock's The Lady Vanishes. Adapted for stage by Bill Kenwright, this was a seven month National Tour. Later in 2019 Fitzgerald was cast alongside Joan Collins and Luke Goss in the UK Comedy Drama Movie The Loss Adjuster. Filming began in October 2019, with release due on 1 December 2020. The movie is a straight to DVD release due to COVID-19.

Filmography

Stage credits

Awards and nominations

References

External links 

 

1996 births
English soap opera actresses
English child actresses
Living people
People from Northampton
21st-century English actresses